Ferdinand Hanusch, also spelled in French Ferdinand Hannouche, (9 November 1866 in Obersdorf bei Wigstadtl, Austrian Silesia (now Horní Ves part of Vítkov, Czech Republic) – 28 September 1923 in Vienna, Austria) was an Austrian socialist politician who served as Vice-Chancellor of Austria from 7 July to 22 October 1920. He was cremated at Feuerhalle Simmering, where also his ashes are buried.

1866 births
1923 deaths
People from Vítkov
People from Austrian Silesia
Silesian-German people
Austrian people of Czech descent
Social Democratic Party of Austria politicians
Vice-Chancellors of Austria
Members of the Austrian House of Deputies (1907–1911)
Members of the Austrian House of Deputies (1911–1918)
Members of the Provisional National Assembly
Members of the Constituent National Assembly (Austria)
Members of the National Council (Austria)
Austrian Freemasons
Burials at Feuerhalle Simmering